Cikote may refer to:
 Cikote (Kosjerić), a village in Kosjerić, Serbia
 Cikote (Loznica), a village in Loznica, Serbia